Enoch Arden Holtwick (January 3, 1881 – March 29, 1972) was an American educator with a long record of actively supporting the temperance movement. He was the Prohibition Party candidate for Illinois State Treasurer in 1936; its candidate for U.S. Senator from Illinois in 1938, 1940, 1942, 1944, 1948 and 1950; its candidate for vice-president of the United States in 1952; and its candidate for president in 1956.

Holtwick was born in Montgomery County, Missouri and grew up near Rhineland, Missouri, where his family was active in the Free Methodist Church. After his political candidacies, he moved to California and became president of Los Angeles Pacific Junior College. He was long associated with Greenville College in Greenville, Illinois, where he taught history and political science, and spent the final years of his life in Greenville, where he is memorialized by the Enoch A. Holtwick Literary Award and Enoch A. Holtwick Hall, a residence building. Long after retirement he continued to give an annual lecture to the student body with a survey of current world events and issues. He died at Fair Oaks Nursing Home in Greenville, Illinois.

References

External links
The Political Graveyard: Enoch A. Holtwick
Greenville College

1881 births
1972 deaths
20th-century American educators
Heads of universities and colleges in the United States
Greenville College people
Illinois Prohibitionists
People from Montgomery County, Missouri
People from Greenville, Illinois
Prohibition Party (United States) presidential nominees
Prohibition Party (United States) vice presidential nominees
1952 United States vice-presidential candidates
Candidates in the 1956 United States presidential election
20th-century American politicians